The Kuala Terengganu City Council (abbreviated MBKT) is the city council which administers Kuala Terengganu City and Kuala Nerus District in the state of Terengganu, Malaysia. This council was established after the city was officially granted city status on 1 January 2008. Their jurisdiction covers an area of 605 square kilometres 1928 as Kuala Terengganu Sanitary Board, 1950 as Kuala Terengganu Town Board, 1979 as Kuala Terengganu Municipal Council, 2008 as Kuala Terengganu City Council.

The council consists of the mayor plus twenty-four councillors appointed to serve a one-year term by the Terengganu State Government.

Headquarters

MBKT Tower, formerly known as Darul Iman Tower is a 31-story, 150.8-meter-tall government office building in Kuala Terengganu, Terengganu, Malaysia. It is East Coast Economic Region's sixth-tallest building. It serves as the headquarters of the Kuala Terengganu City Council. It is located beside the icon of the city, Kuala Terengganu Drawbridge.

Appointed mayors of Kuala Terengganu

Since 2008, the city has been led by four mayors. The previous mayors are listed as below:

Current appointed councillors

2020/2022 Session 

 Mohd Sidek Abdullah
 Mohd Zabidi Amat
 Tuan Chik Tuan Muda
 Sanusi Md Taib
 Mohd Nordin Mahmood
 Mohamad Iszeham Mat Ali
 Che Sulaiman Ismail
 Mohd Razaki Daud
 Ramli Ismail
 Hassan Wahid
 Azmi A. Rahman
 Mohd Azrin Mohd Aris @ Mohd Aziz
 Chua Kim Huat
 Khairuddin Muhammad
 Wan Mokhtar @ W. Moxtor Wan Kadir
 Mohamad Ubaidah Tengah
 Mohd Shafie Taib
 Ahmad Firdaus Mohd @ Mohd Hamdan
 Pauzai Husain
 Harun Salleh

References

External links

Kuala Terengganu
Local government in Terengganu
City councils in Malaysia